The 2014–15 UNLV Runnin' Rebels basketball team represented the University of Nevada, Las Vegas during the 2014–15 NCAA Division I men's basketball season. The Runnin' Rebels were led by fourth year head coach Dave Rice. They played their home games at the Thomas & Mack Center in Paradise, Nevada as members of the Mountain West Conference. They finished the season 18–15, 8–10 in Mountain West play to finish in seventh place. They advanced to the quarterfinals of the Mountain West tournament where they lost to San Diego State.

Off Season

Departures

Incoming Transfers

2014 Recruiting Class

Roster

Schedule and results

|-
!colspan=9 style="background:#666666; color:#C10202;"| Exhibition

|-
!colspan=9 style="background:#666666; color:#C10202;"| Regular season

|-
!colspan=9 style="background:#666666; color:#C10202;"| Mountain West tournament

References

UNLV
UNLV Runnin' Rebels basketball seasons
Run
Run